The Department of Environmental Affairs was a department of the South African government with responsibility for the environment. It was created in 2009 when the Department of Environmental Affairs and Tourism was split into two departments, and was replaced in 2019 by the Department of Environment, Forestry and Fisheries which also incorporated the forestry and fisheries components from the former Department of Agriculture, Forestry and Fisheries.

Environmental Affairs
South Africa, Environmental Affairs
Environmental agencies in South Africa
Government agencies established in 2009
2009 establishments in South Africa
2019 disestablishments in South Africa